American Garage is the second album by the Pat Metheny Group, released in 1979 on ECM Records.

The album represented the most collaborative writing session between Pat Metheny and Lyle Mays up to that point in the band's history. According to Metheny, this yielded mixed results. He has said that the album's second track, "Airstream," is a favorite from this period. But both he and Mays have expressed less praise for the fifth and final track, "The Epic", which Metheny has claimed, "is all over the map."

Track listing

Personnel
 Pat Metheny – 6-and 12-string electric and acoustic guitars
 Lyle Mays – piano, Oberheim synthesizer, autoharp, electric organ
 Mark Egan – electric bass
 Dan Gottlieb – drums

Charts
Album – Billboard

See also
1979 in jazz

References

1979 albums
Pat Metheny albums
ECM Records albums
Albums produced by Manfred Eicher
Albums recorded at Long View Farm